Kamer is a given name. Notable people with the name include:

Surname:
Hiltje Maas-van de Kamer (born 1941), botanist at the Institute of Systematic Botany at Utrecht University
Nadja Kamer (born 1986), World Cup alpine ski racer from Switzerland
Nimrod Kamer, satirist and journalist living in London

Given name:
Kamer Genç (born 1940), Turkish politician of Zaza origin
Kamer Qaka (born 1995), Norwegian footballer
Kamer Sadik (born 1986), famed Turkish actor of Armenian origin

See also
Eerste Kamer, the upper house of the States General, the legislature of the Netherlands
Tweede Kamer, the lower house of the bicameral parliament of the Netherlands
Kamer van Koophandel (KvK) is the Chamber of Commerce in the Netherlands
Kamer 2 Sailing Marathon, 50 kilometer steeplechase type regatta for sloops in The Netherlands
Kamer-Kollezhsky Val, a ring of streets around the center of Moscow, Russia
Ka-Mer
Kamera (disambiguation)
Kammer (disambiguation)
Kmer (disambiguation)
Kramer (disambiguation)